The National Careers Service is the publicly funded careers service for adults and young people (aged 13 or over) in England.

Launched in April 2012, it brings together elements of previous publicly funded careers services for adults and young people such as Connexions or Next Step.

The launch was reported by news outlets including the BBC and commented on by organisations such as NIACE, the Association of Graduate Careers Advisory Services, and NAEGA.

The National Careers Service aims to provide information, advice and guidance on learning, training, career choice, career development, searching for work, and the labour market. It can be accessed online, by telephone, and face to face (for people aged 19 and over).

The service aims to provide:

“high-quality information about careers and skills, and independent, professional advice and guidance”
“a focus on specialist careers guidance, built on the principles of independence and professional standards”
“information, advice and guidance both to inform and to stimulate demand for further education, work-based training and higher education.”

History
The idea of a careers service for those aged 13 and over was raised in the Department for Business, Innovation and Skills strategy document ‘Investing in Skills for Sustainable Growth’ published in November 2010.  Plans for the new service were laid out in a further document, ‘New Challenges, New Chances: Further Education and Skills System Reform Plan: Building a World Class Skills System’, published December 2011.

Next Step
Prior to the National Careers Service, the publicly funded careers service for adults in England was known as Next Step.

Next Step launched on 1 August 2010 and for the first time fully integrated the existing web-based, telephone-based and local face to face careers services for adults.

Connexions Direct
Telephone and web-based advice for young people was previously provided through Connexions Direct, which was part of the wider Connexions service.

Funding
The National Careers Service is funded and managed by the Education and Skills Funding Agency, sponsored by the Department for Education.

Services provided
The remit of the National Careers Service is to provide “information, advice and guidance to help [customers] make decisions on learning, training and work opportunities." The service offers confidential and impartial advice, supported by qualified careers advisers.
 
This includes support with:
CV writing
Understanding the job market
Searching and applying for jobs
Interview techniques
Searching for courses and training schemes
Finding funding to support learning
Finding out about volunteering opportunities to help develop work skills
Identifying key strengths and skills
Exploring career options
Choosing training routes
Developing a plan for career goals.

The service also participates in national learning campaigns such as Adult Learners' Week.

Whilst available to any individual aged 13+, National Careers Service focuses on supporting six priority groups to get into work. These include: young people aged 18–24 who are not in education, employment or training; those unemployed for more than 12 months; low-skilled adults; single parents; unemployed adults over 50; and adults with special educational needs or who have a disability.

The National Careers Service offer is available throughout England, with devolved responsibility for careers advice in Scotland, Wales and Northern Ireland. Publicly funded careers services for Northern Ireland, Scotland and Wales are provided by Careers Service Northern Ireland, Skills Development Scotland and Careers Wales respectively. There is also a dedicated careers service for the Isle of Man.

Service access
The National Careers Service can be accessed online, by telephone, or face-to-face for those who are 19 or over.

Website
The National Careers Service website contains sections on careers information and help to plan and implement career development activities. This can be accessed independently of careers advisers.

Sections include:
Interactive career tools including a CV builder, skills assessment package, and action planning tool. People aged 13 or over can register on the website to create a Lifelong Learning Account which will store the output of the interactive tools, details of current qualifications, course search results, and funding information.
Careers advice - pages with information and advice on a range of subjects related to learning and careers, such as how to find funding, dealing with redundancy, advice for ex-offenders and returning to the workplace. This section includes a library of over 750 job profiles. The job profiles provide descriptions of job roles, details of entry routes and training, the qualifications and skills required, and hyperlinks to associated professional bodies and organisations.

The website also provides the facility to email an adviser or talk to an adviser by webchat, and has online community areas including forums.

Mobile website
The National Careers Service mobile website was developed to provide a mobile friendly platform for accessing learning and work related information helping service users to develop a CV, search for work, prepare for an interview and more.

It includes a job profile section with information about specific job roles, what they involve, necessary qualifications and where to look for vacancies.

The National Careers Service mobile website has regularly updated content, with features including:
	
 A function to share information via social media.
 Graphic novels showing how careers advice can help you progress in work and life.
 General advice on careers updated weekly.
 Careers advice articles with advice such as how to answer difficult questions in an interview and using social media in your job search.
 A map of careers events in your local area.
 Infographics presenting careers and education data.

Telephone
The telephone number for the National Careers Service helpline is 0800 100 900 and the helpline is open every day between 8am and 10pm.

Customers of all ages use the same phone number and then select options for young people or for adults – advice for these groups is provided by two separate organisations.

Minicom users can access the service through the number 08000 968 336 (for people aged 13 to 18), or 08000 568 865 (for people aged 19 or over).

The National Careers Service also has dedicated numbers which provide support in the languages listed below:

French - 0800 093 1115
Gujarati - 0800 093 1119
Persian - 0800 093 1116
Polish - 0800 093 1114
Punjabi - 0800 093 1333
Somali - 0800 093 1555
Sylheti - 0800 093 1444
Urdu - 0800 093 1118

These lines are available for people aged 19 or over only and are open Monday to Friday, 9am to 5pm (the Punjabi and Urdu phonelines operate from 9am to 8pm). This facility is promoted among non-English speaking communities and targets those who want to improve their English skills and employment opportunities.

Face-to-face
Adults may be able to get face-to-face guidance in their community. People aged 19 or over can request a face-to-face appointment at a local office of the National Careers Service. To book an appointment, customers can call the telephone helpline who will put them in contact with their regional hub, and from there an appointment will be made at the customer’s local office.

People aged 18 who are claiming benefits or who are in custody are also eligible for face-to-face advice through the National Careers Service.

The service also has presences in other locations, including in Jobcentres, FE colleges, community centres, shops and places of worship.

Quality standards
All local centres and the contact centre providers must undergo a matrix Standard assessment, with all providers meeting the enhanced matrix Standard by the end of March 2013.

The matrix Standard is an independent quality standard for information, advice and guidance services. To achieve accreditation, organisations must undergo inspection and show that they meet requirements around leadership and management, resources, service delivery and continuous quality improvement.

Capacity
At its foundation the Government aimed for the National Careers Service to have the capacity to help 700,000 adults face-to-face each year, to handle up to one million telephone advice sessions and provide 20 million online sessions.

References

External links

Mobile website

Career advice services
Career development in the United Kingdom
Employment in the United Kingdom
Public bodies and task forces of the United Kingdom government
Youth employment